Patter is a prepared and practiced speech that is designed to produce a desired response from its audience. Examples of occupations with a patter might include the auctioneer, salesperson, dance caller, magician, or comedian.

The term may have been a colloquial shortening of "Pater Noster", or the Lord's Prayer, and may have referred to the practice of mouthing or mumbling prayers quickly and mechanically.

From this, it became a slang word for the secret and equally incomprehensible mutterings of a cant language used by beggars, thieves, fences, etc., and then the fluent plausible talk that a cheap-jack employs to pass off his goods. Many illusionists, e.g., card magicians, use patter both to enhance the show and to distract the attention of the spectators.

It is thus also used of any rapid manner of talking, and of a patter-song, in which a very large number of words have to be sung at high speed to fit the music. A western square dance caller may interpolate patter—in the form of metrical lines, often of nonsense—to fill in between commands to the dancers.

In some circumstances, the talk becomes a different sense of "patter": to make a series of rapid strokes or pats, as of raindrops. Here, it is a form of onomatopoeia.

In certain forms of entertainment, peep shows (in the historical meaning) and Russian rayok, patter is an important component of a show.  The radio DJ patter is among the roots of rapping.

In hypnotherapy, the hypnotist uses a 'patter' or script to deliver positive suggestions for change to the client.

In London Labour and the London Poor, Henry Mayhew divides the street-sellers of his time into two groups: the patterers, and everyone else.

See also
 Joe Ades, a well-known seller of peelers in New York

Notes

References
 

Entertainment
Oral communication